Kris Jogan (born 14 September 1991) is a Slovenian footballer who plays for NK Brda as a forward.

Club career
Jogan started his career playing at youth level for Gorica, where he signed a professional contract in 2010. In August 2012, he transferred to Verona, but was immediately loaned to Gorica. In January 2013, he was loaned to Rijeka.

On 30 August 2013 he left for Nocerina.

On 30 January 2014 he left for Aversa Normanna. In summer 2014 he was released by Verona. In the same summer he returned to Slovenia for ND Bilje. In early 2015, Jogan signed with the Austrian Regionalliga West side FC Kufstein. In 2016, he once again returned to Slovenia, spending a season with NK Brda in the Slovenian Second League. In 2017, Jogan joined Italian lower division side Sammaurese.

References

External links
NZS profile 

1991 births
Living people
People from Šempeter pri Gorici
Slovenian footballers
Slovenian expatriate footballers
Slovenia youth international footballers
Slovenia under-21 international footballers
Association football forwards
Slovenian PrvaLiga players
Slovenian Second League players
Serie C players
Serie D players
Austrian Regionalliga players
Croatian Football League players
ND Gorica players
Hellas Verona F.C. players
HNK Rijeka players
A.S.G. Nocerina players
S.F. Aversa Normanna players
S.S.D. Calcio San Donà players
NK Brda players
Slovenian expatriate sportspeople in Croatia
Expatriate footballers in Croatia
Slovenian expatriate sportspeople in Italy
Expatriate footballers in Italy
Slovenian expatriate sportspeople in Austria
Expatriate footballers in Austria